John Whiteford (born 22 January 1957) is a British former professional tennis player.

A left-handed player from Sussex, Whiteford featured in several editions of the Wimbledon Championships, including main draw appearances in doubles. In 1981 he was one of three British players arrested on arrival in Nigeria to compete in the Lagos Open, due to their prior participation at tournaments in apartheid South Africa. The incident resulted in the Lagos event being excluded from the Grand Prix calendar for a year.

Whiteford, who played a season of U.S. collegiate tennis for Rice University in 1976, has served as the head coach at the University of Bath and has coached Britain at the World University Games.

References

External links
 
 

1957 births
Living people
British male tennis players
Rice Owls men's tennis players
Tennis people from East Sussex
English male tennis players